The 10th International Emmy Kids Awards ceremony, presented by the International Academy of Television Arts and Sciences (IATAS), took place on October 12, 2021. The nominations were announced on September 7, 2021.

Ceremony information
Nominations for the 10th International Emmy Kids Awards were announced on September 7, 2021 by the International Academy of Television Arts and Sciences (IATAS). The winners were announced on October 12, 2021.  The announcement was made during an online presentation on the Academy’s website during MipJunior.

Winners

References

External links 
 International Academy of Television Arts and Sciences website

International Emmy Kids Awards ceremonies
International Emmy Kids Awards
International Emmy Kids Awards
International Emmy Kids Awards